The UWA World Junior Light Heavyweight Championship (Campeonato Mundia de Peso Semicompleto Junior UWA in Spanish) is a professional wrestling championship that was originally promoted by the Mexican lucha libre professional wrestling) promotion Universal Wrestling Association (UWA). the UWA operated from 1975 to 1995 but the title is still defended on the Mexican independent circuit after the UWA closed. The UWA World Junior Heavyweight Championship has also been promoted by New Japan Pro-Wrestling and was at one time one of the eight championships that made up the J-Crown Championship. Following the breakup of the J-Crown, the championship was used by the Toryumon promotion but has since then returned to Mexico where it's defended on the independent circuit.

Super Nova is the current holder of the UWA World Junior Light Heavyweight Championship, having defeated Operativo 209 for the title on May 17, 2013. As it was a professional wrestling championship, the championship was not won not by actual competition, but by a scripted ending to a match determined by the bookers and match makers. On occasion the promotion declares a championship vacant, which means there is no champion at that point in time. This can either be due to a storyline, or real life issues such as a champion suffering an injury being unable to defend the championship, or leaving the company.

Title history
Key

Footnotes

References

Junior light heavyweight wrestling championships
New Japan Pro-Wrestling championships
Universal Wrestling Association championships
Michinoku Pro Wrestling championships
Toryumon championships
World professional wrestling championships